Pavel Fyodorovich Pleshanov (Russian: Павел Фёдорович Плешанов; (1829—1882) was a Russian portrait and history painter. Member of the Imperial Academy of Arts.

Biography 
His father was a wealthy merchant. After graduating from the Imperial Commercial College, he decided to devote himself to art instead and enrolled at the Imperial Academy of Fine Arts in 1848. While there, he also took private lessons from Fyodor Bruni.

In 1854, he was awarded a gold medal and, the following year, received the title of "Artist" for his painting of Jesus at the home of Martha and Mary. On Bruni's advice, he spent two years studying in Rome.

After his father's death in 1867, the family's affairs fell into the hands of his older brother who, through mismanagement or extravagance, soon left them without means. As a result, he had to leave the family mansion. Fortunately, he was able to get a teaching position at the Academy and moved into an apartment there.

Although he was temperamentally unsuited to teaching, he was named a Professor in 1869 for his version of the death of the Tsarevich Dmitri. In 1877, he became a member of the Academy's governing board.

Despite his career successes, he was dissatisfied because he had to paint by commission, rather than what he chose and, eventually, being the sole support of his indebted brother's family took its toll in the form of an enlarged heart, which led to his death at the age of fifty-three.

Works

References

Literary sources

External links

1829 births
1882 deaths
19th-century painters from the Russian Empire
Russian male painters
History painters
Russian portrait painters
Painters from Saint Petersburg
Burials at Tikhvin Cemetery
19th-century male artists from the Russian Empire